The First Mrs. Fraser may refer to:

 The First Mrs. Fraser (play), a 1929 play by St John Ervine
 The First Mrs. Fraser (1932 film), a British film directed by Sinclair Hill
 The First Mrs. Fraser (1950 film), a British television film 
 The First Mrs. Fraser (1955 film), a German film directed by Erich Engel and Josef von Báky